St. Clair is an unincorporated community and census-designated place (CDP) in Blair County, Pennsylvania, United States. It was first listed as a CDP prior to the 2020 census.

The CDP is in eastern Blair County, in the southerrn part of Catharine Township. It is bordered to the southwest by the Frankstown Branch of the Juniata River, which forms the border with Woodbury Township to the south. Pennsylvania Route 866 passes through St. Clair, leading southeast  to Williamsburg and northwest  to U.S. Route 22 near Point View.

References 

Census-designated places in Blair County, Pennsylvania
Census-designated places in Pennsylvania